In orbital mechanics, a frozen orbit is an orbit for an artificial satellite in which natural drifting due to the central body's shape has been minimized by careful selection of the orbital parameters. Typically, this is an orbit in which, over a long period of time, the satellite's altitude remains constant at the same point in each orbit. Changes in the inclination, position of the apsis of the orbit, and eccentricity have been minimized by choosing initial values so that their perturbations cancel out., which results in a long-term stable orbit that minimizes the use of station-keeping propellant.

Background and motivation
For most spacecraft, changes to orbits are caused by the oblateness of the Earth, gravitational attraction from the sun and moon, solar radiation pressure, and air drag. These are called "perturbing forces". They must be counteracted by maneuvers to keep the spacecraft in the desired orbit. For a geostationary spacecraft, correction maneuvers on the order of 40–50 m/s per year are required to counteract the gravitational forces from the sun and moon which move the orbital plane away from the equatorial plane of the Earth.

For sun-synchronous spacecraft, intentional shifting of the orbit plane (called "precession") can be used for the benefit of the mission. For these missions, a near-circular orbit with an altitude of 600–900 km is used. An appropriate inclination (97.8-99.0 degrees) is selected so that the precession of the orbital plane is equal to the rate of movement of the Earth around the sun, about 1 degree per day.

As a result, the spacecraft will pass over points on the Earth that have the same time of day during every orbit. For instance, if the orbit is "square to the sun", the vehicle will always pass over points at which it is 6 a.m. on the north-bound portion, and 6 p.m. on the south-bound portion (or vice versa). This is called a "Dawn-Dusk" orbit. Alternatively, if the sun lies in the orbital plane, the vehicle will always pass over places where it is midday on the north-bound leg, and places where it is midnight on the south-bound leg (or vice versa). These are called "Noon-Midnight" orbits. Such orbits are desirable for many Earth observation missions such as weather, imagery, and mapping.

The perturbing force caused by the oblateness of the Earth will in general perturb not only the orbital plane but also the eccentricity vector of the orbit. There exists, however, an almost circular orbit for which there are no secular/long periodic perturbations of the eccentricity vector, only periodic perturbations with period equal to the orbital period. Such an orbit is then perfectly periodic (except for the orbital plane precession) and it is therefore called a "frozen orbit". Such an orbit is often the preferred choice for an Earth observation mission where repeated observations of the same area of the Earth should be made under as constant observation conditions as possible.

The Earth observation satellites ERS-1, ERS-2 and Envisat are operated in sun-synchronous frozen orbits.

Lunar frozen orbits
Through a study of many lunar orbiting satellites, scientists have discovered that most low lunar orbits (LLO) are unstable. Four frozen lunar orbits have been identified at 27°, 50°, 76°, and 86° inclination. NASA expounded on this in 2006:

Lunar mascons make most low lunar orbits unstable ... As a satellite passes 50 or 60 miles overhead, the mascons pull it forward, back, left, right, or down, the exact direction and magnitude of the tugging depends on the satellite's trajectory. Absent any periodic boosts from onboard rockets to correct the orbit, most satellites released into low lunar orbits (under about 60 miles or 100 km) will eventually crash into the Moon. ... [There are] a number of 'frozen orbits' where a spacecraft can stay in a low lunar orbit indefinitely. They occur at four inclinations: 27°, 50°, 76°, and 86°"—the last one being nearly over the lunar poles. The orbit of the relatively long-lived Apollo 15 subsatellite PFS-1 had an inclination of 28°, which turned out to be close to the inclination of one of the frozen orbits—but less fortunate PFS-2 had an orbital inclination of only 11°.

Classical theory

The classical theory of frozen orbits is essentially based on the analytical perturbation analysis for artificial satellites of Dirk Brouwer made under contract with NASA and published in 1959.

This analysis can be carried out as follows:

In the article orbital perturbation analysis the secular perturbation of the orbital pole  from the  term of the geopotential model is shown to be

which can be expressed in terms of orbital elements thus:

Making a similar analysis for the  term (corresponding to the fact that the earth is slightly pear shaped), one gets

which can be expressed in terms of orbital elements as

where:

 The first term is the in-plane perturbation of the eccentricity vector caused by the in-plane component of the perturbing force
 The second term is the effect of the new position of the ascending node in the new orbital plane, the orbital plane being perturbed by the out-of-plane force component

Making the analysis for the  term one gets for the first term, i.e. for the perturbation of the eccentricity vector from the in-plane force component

Similarly the quadratic terms of the eccentricity vector components in  can be ignored for almost circular orbits, i.e. can be approximated with

Adding the  contribution 

to one gets

Now the difference equation shows that the eccentricity vector will describe a circle centered at the point ; the polar argument of the eccentricity vector increases with  radians between consecutive orbits.

As

The latter figure means that the eccentricity vector will have described a full circle in 1569 orbits.

In terms of classical orbital elements, this means that a frozen orbit should have the following mean elements:

Modern theory
The modern theory of frozen orbits is based on the algorithm given in a 1989 article by Mats Rosengren.

For this the analytical expression is used to iteratively update the initial (mean) eccentricity vector to obtain that the (mean) eccentricity vector several orbits later computed by the precise numerical propagation takes precisely the same value. In this way the secular perturbation of the eccentricity vector caused by the  term is used to counteract all secular perturbations, not only those (dominating) caused by the  term. One such additional secular perturbation that in this way can be compensated for is the one caused by the solar radiation pressure, this perturbation is discussed in the article "Orbital perturbation analysis (spacecraft)".

This algorithm is implemented in the orbit control software used for the Earth observation satellites ERS-1, ERS-2 and Envisat

Derivation of the closed form expressions for the J3 perturbation

The main perturbing force to be counteracted in order to have a frozen orbit is the " force", i.e. the gravitational force caused by an imperfect symmetry north–south of the Earth, and the "classical theory" is based on the closed form expression for this " perturbation".  With the "modern theory" this explicit closed form expression is not directly used but it is certainly still worthwhile to derive it.

The derivation of this expression can be done as follows:

The potential from a zonal term is rotational symmetric around the  polar axis of the Earth and corresponding force is entirely in a longitudinal plane with one component  in the radial direction and one component   with the unit vector  orthogonal to the radial direction towards north.

In the article Geopotential model it is shown that these force components caused by the  term are

Let  make up a rectangular coordinate system with origin in the center of the Earth (in the center of the Reference ellipsoid)  such that  points in the direction north and such that  are in the equatorial plane of the Earth with  pointing towards the ascending node, i.e. towards the blue point of Figure 2.

The components of the unit vectors

Firstly

and this projection is 

where  is the unit vector  orthogonal to the radial direction towards north illustrated in figure 1.

From equation we see that

and therefore:

In the article Orbital perturbation analysis (spacecraft) it is further shown that the secular perturbation of the orbital pole  is

The fraction  is

where

are the components of the eccentricity vector in the  coordinate system.

As all integrals of type

and

It follows that

where

 is the force component (per unit mass) in the direction of the orbit pole 

In the article Orbital perturbation analysis (spacecraft) it is shown that the secular perturbation of the eccentricity vector is

where

 is the usual local coordinate system with unit vector  directed away from the Earth
 - the velocity component in direction 
 - the velocity component in direction 

Using that

the integral above can be split in 8 terms:

Given that

we obtain

and that all integrals of type

Term 1

Term 2

Term 3

Term 4

Term 5

Term 6

Term 7

Term 8

As

It follows that

References

Further reading
 STUDY OF ORBITAL ELEMENTS ON THE NEIGHBOURHOOD OF A FROZEN ORBIT. including atmospheric drag and J5 terms

Astrodynamics
Orbits
Spaceflight concepts